Slightly Dangerous is a 1943 American romantic comedy film starring Lana Turner and Robert Young. The screenplay concerns a bored young woman in a dead-end job who runs away to New York City and ends up impersonating the long-lost daughter of a millionaire. The film was directed by Wesley Ruggles and written by Charles Lederer and George Oppenheimer from a story by Aileen Hamilton. According to Turner Classic Movies film historian Robert Osborne, one sequence early in the film – in which Lana Turner's character does her job at the soda fountain while blindfolded – was actually directed by an uncredited Buster Keaton.

Cast
 Lana Turner as Peggy Evans / "Carol Burden"
 Robert Young as Bob Stuart
 Walter Brennan as Cornelius Burden
 Dame May Whitty as Baba
 Eugene Pallette as Durstin
 Alan Mowbray as an English gentleman
 Florence Bates as Mrs. Amanda Roanoke-Brooke
 Howard Freeman as Mr. Quill
 Millard Mitchell as Baldwin
 Ward Bond as Jimmy
 Pamela Blake as Mitzi
 Ray Collins as Snodgrass
 Gordon Richards  as Garrett, the Butler
 Emory Parnell as Policeman
 Robert Blake as Boy on Porch (uncredited)

Box office
According to MGM records the film earned $1,579,000 in the US and Canada and $672,000 elsewhere resulting in a profit of $4,776,000.

References

External links 
 
 
 
 

1943 films
American black-and-white films
Films directed by Wesley Ruggles
1943 romantic comedy films
American romantic comedy films
Metro-Goldwyn-Mayer films
Films with screenplays by Charles Lederer
Films scored by Bronisław Kaper
1940s English-language films
1940s American films